Gron may refer to the following places:

Gron, Cher, a commune in the department of Cher, France
Gron, Yonne, a commune in the department of Yonne, France
Groń, Tatra County, a village in southern Poland
Grön, a Swedish/Finnish surname (including a list of persons with the name)
Grøn, a Danish/Norwegian surname (including a list of persons with the name)
 Gron, another surname
 Stanislav Gron (born 1978), Slovak hockey player
 Groń, also a surname
 Franciszek Gąsienica Groń (1931–2014), Polish athlete